Log is a small settlement in the hills northeast of Blagovica in the Municipality of Lukovica in the eastern part of the Upper Carniola region of Slovenia.

References

External links
Log on Geopedia

Populated places in the Municipality of Lukovica